Oleksiy Khizhniak (born 9 June 1975) is a Ukrainian weightlifter. He competed in the men's lightweight event at the 1996 Summer Olympics.

References

1975 births
Living people
Ukrainian male weightlifters
Olympic weightlifters of Ukraine
Weightlifters at the 1996 Summer Olympics
Place of birth missing (living people)
20th-century Ukrainian people
21st-century Ukrainian people